Grandhotel Zvon is the oldest hotel in the Czech Republic founded in 1533 and located in the České Budějovice city.

During 2006-2007 was reconstructed and now offers 148 beds in 65 rooms. In the hotel building are located various services and shops.

See also 
List of oldest companies

References 
Article contains translated text from Hotel Zvon (České Budějovice) on the Czech Wikipedia retrieved on 25 February 2017.

External links 
Homepage
Facebook page

Hotels in the Czech Republic
Restaurants in the Czech Republic
Companies established in the 16th century
16th-century establishments in Bohemia
Hotels established in the 16th century
1533 establishments in the Habsburg monarchy